The 1904 Colorado Agricultural Aggies football team represented Colorado Agricultural College (now known as Colorado State University) in the Colorado Football Association (CFA) during the 1904 college football season.  In their first season under head coach John H. McIntosh, the Aggies compiled a 0–4–1 record, finished last in the CFA, and were outscored by a total of 125 to 6.

Schedule

References

Colorado Agricultural
Colorado State Rams football seasons
Colorado Agricultural Aggies football